SMS Friedrich der Grosse  (or Große ) was an ironclad turret ship built for the German Kaiserliche Marine (Imperial Navy). Named for Frederick the Great, she was laid down at the Imperial Dockyard in Kiel in 1871 and completed in 1877. Her main battery of four  guns was mounted pair of twin gun turrets amidships.

Friedrich der Grosse served with the fleet from her commissioning until 1896, though she was frequently placed in reserve throughout her career. The ship was a regular participant in the annual fleet training maneuvers conducted with the exception of the mid-1880s, when she was temporarily replaced by newer vessels. She participated in several cruises in the Baltic and Mediterranean Seas, often escorting Kaiser Wilhelm II on official state visits. The ship was removed from active service in 1896, after which she was used in secondary roles until 1919, when she was stricken from the naval register and sold to a scrapyard. Friedrich der Grosse was broken up for scrap the following year.

Design 

Initially ordered as casemate ships, the vessels were re-designed as turret ships; they were the first uniform class of ironclads built by for the German fleet.

Friedrich der Grosse was powered by one 3-cylinder single expansion steam engine, which drove a single screw propeller. Steam was supplied by six coal-fired transverse trunk boilers, which were vented into a single funnel. She was also equipped with a full ship rig. Her standard complement consisted of 46 officers and 454 enlisted men.

She was armed with a main battery of four  L/22 guns mounted in a pair of gun turrets placed on the centerline amidships. As built, the ship was also equipped with two  L/25 chase guns, one in the bow and one in the stern. After being rebuilt in 1888–1890, her armament was increased by six and later ten  L/30 quick-firing guns, a pair of machine guns, and five  torpedo tubes, all placed in the ship's hull below the waterline. 

Friedrich der Grosses armor was made of wrought iron and backed with teak. The armored belt was arrayed in two strakes. The gun turrets were protected by  armor on the sides, backed by 260 mm of teak.

Service history

Construction – 1881

Friedrich der Grosse was ordered by the Imperial Navy from the Imperial Dockyard in Kiel; her keel was laid in 1871 under construction number 1. The ship was launched on 20 September 1874 and commissioned into the German fleet on 22 November 1877. Although laid down a year before her sister , Friedrich der Grosse was not completed until a year after; this was because she was built at a newly established and inexperienced Imperial Dockyard, while Preussen was built by AG Vulcan, an experienced private shipbuilder. The ship cost the German government 7,303,000 gold marks.

After her commissioning in November 1877, Friedrich der Grosse served with the fleet. In April 1878, Friedrich der Grosse was reactivated to participate in the annual summer fleet maneuvers, under the command of Konteradmiral (Rear Admiral} Carl Ferdinand Batsch. Her newly commissioned sister-ship, joined the squadron shortly before maneuvers were scheduled to begin. At the time, Friedrich der Grosse suffered from mechanical problems, and on 22 May, she ran aground off Nyborg while steaming from Kiel to Wilhelmshaven. The ship suffered serious damage to her hull, which, coupled with her chronic engine problems, forced her to miss the fleet maneuvers. While the squadron steamed in the English Channel on 31 May, the armored frigate  accidentally rammed Grosser Kurfürst; the latter quickly sank with the loss of 276 men.

In the aftermath of the loss of Grosser Kurfürst, the Navy canceled the summer 1878 maneuvers. Apart from the small ironclad , all armored warships were put in reserve until the following year. In May 1879, the armored squadron was reactivated, under the command of Konteradmiral Franz Kinderling. Kinderling took his four ships out into the North Sea in June for a visit to Norway. The four ships returned to Kiel in September, when the squadron was disbanded for the winter.

In the spring of 1880, the squadron was again reestablished. The new armored corvette  replaced Kronprinz in the squadron that year. Wilhelm von Wickede, a former Austrian naval officer, replaced Kinderling as the squadron commander. In June, the Italian screw corvette  visited the armored squadron in Kiel. Again, the squadron remained in the Baltic for the summer cruise, with the exception of a short visit to Wilhelmshaven and Cuxhaven in August. The summer cruise in 1881 followed the same pattern as the year previous, though Kronprinz returned in place of Sachsen, which was plagued with engine problems. Wickede again served as the commander. In July, the ships hosted a visit by the British reserve squadron, which by this time included the first British ironclad, . Preussen and the rest of the squadron visited Danzig in September during a meeting between Kaiser Wilhelm I and the Russian Tsar Alexander III.

1882–1919

The 1882 summer cruise included the same four ironclads from the previous year, and was again commanded by Wickede, who had by then been promoted to Konteradmiral. Friedrich der Grosse was kept in reserve during the annual summer maneuvers starting in 1883, as new ships, including the rest of the s entered service. From 1883 to 1885, the ship underwent a modernization that included new boilers and a reconstructed poop deck. Two  Hotchkiss guns and five torpedo tubes were added in above-water mounts. The ship was reactivated in July 1888 to participate in a tour of the Baltic for the newly enthroned Kaiser Wilhelm II. The voyage included visits to St. Petersburg, Stockholm, and Copenhagen. They met Tsar Alexander III and the Swedish King Oscar II, who inspected the German warships and conferred decorations on the senior officers.

In August 1889, Friedrich der Grosse participated in Kaiser Wilhelm II's visit to Great Britain. The fleet then conducted maneuvers in the North Sea before returning to Germany. Friedrich der Grosse and the rest of II Division became the training squadron for the fleet in 1889–1890, the first year the Kaiserliche Marine maintained a year-round ironclad force. The squadron escorted Wilhelm II's imperial yacht to the Mediterranean; the voyage included state visits to Italy and the Ottoman Empire. The squadron remained in the Mediterranean until April 1890, when it returned to Germany.

Friedrich der Grosse participated in the ceremonial transfer of the island of Helgoland from British to German control in the summer of 1890. She was present during the fleet maneuvers in September, where the entire eight-ship armored squadron simulated a Russian fleet blockading Kiel. II Division, including Friedrich der Grosse, served as the training squadron in the winter of 1890–1891. The squadron again cruised the Mediterranean, under the command of Konteradmiral Wilhelm Schröder. Friedrich der Grosse again saw service in II Division in the winter of 1891–1892 and the 1892 maneuvers, under the command of Konteradmiral Hans von Koester.

The ship participated in the 1893 maneuvers, which included a simulation of a French naval attack in the North Sea. The following year, Friedrich der Grosse, König Wilhelm, and Deutschland joined the new battleship  as re-designated II Division of the Maneuver Squadron, under the command of Konteradmiral Otto von Diederichs. The ships simulated a Russian attack on Germany's Baltic coast in the 1894 maneuvers. She was reduced to a harbor ship on 16 November 1896. The ship was stricken from the active register on 21 May 1906, after which she was used as a coal hulk for torpedo boats. Friedrich der Grosse served in this capacity until after the end of World War I; she was removed from the naval register on 27 January 1919. She was sold to shipbreakers and broken up for scrap the following year in Rönnebeck.

Footnotes

Notes

Citations

References 

 
 
 
 

Preussen-class ironclads
Coal hulks
1874 ships
Frederick the Great